Lego Star Wars III: The Clone Wars is a Lego-themed action-adventure video game developed by Traveller's Tales and published by LucasArts in March 2011 for the PlayStation 3, PlayStation Portable, Xbox 360, Wii, Nintendo DS, Microsoft Windows and a launch title for the Nintendo 3DS. The game features missions and characters from the 2008 animated film Star Wars: The Clone Wars and its follow-up television series, as well as fan-favorites from the original Star Wars saga, in both single-player and multiplayer gameplay modes. The Mac OS X version of the game was released by Feral Interactive.

Gameplay
Gameplay in Lego Star Wars III: The Clone Wars is similar to the previous titles in the series, and other Lego video games. Up to two players can switch between different characters to fight enemies in combat, solve puzzles, and progress through various levels. It introduces a few novelties, including scene swap, where players can switch between teams in separate locations to complete multi-part objectives, and boss battles. The game also features some real-time strategy elements, such as commanding large ground armies across battlefields. Also, the space fights have been remodelled to use a more instinctive, 3D-space battle sensation. It is set during the Clone Wars animated series, as well as certain scenes from Star Wars: Episode II – Attack of the Clones, unlike the original games, which featured characters from the first six films of Star Wars such as Lego Star Wars: The Video Game and Lego Star Wars II: The Original Trilogy. The console version of the game features 115 characters. The portable version features 77 characters. The version for the PSP, 3DS, and DS have some differences from the console version. For example, the ground battles are not featured. The portable version features unlockable minigames like Snowball Fight, Volleyball Droids and more. The rooms where vehicles are also not available to test in the ship itself unlike on the console version. Some levels are removed from the portable version. Some characters such as the Galactic Marine, Chi Cho, Ryo Chuchi, Thi-Sen and others, are featured on the portable version but not on the console version.

New features
Overall, the game engine used by previous Lego Star Wars games has been upgraded. It can now hold more than 200 moving units or objects on-screen. The graphics are more detailed than before, and the lighting has been improved.

New features include scenarios in which players can command large armies of clones to battle against droid armies (although not on DS), and Story Swap mode, in which players can switch between two characters in different areas whose stories run simultaneously. The game includes split screen combat. All new character features include lightsaber throwing, picking up droids and stepping on certain pads in which Jedi do "combo moves" to destroy certain objects. Vehicle levels have been altered; now, players can land their ship and begin fighting on foot (similar to Star Wars: Battlefront II). All the original elements seen in previous Lego Star Wars games have returned. The hub has also been changed, taking place in a Republic Cruiser named the Resolute and also a Separatist Ship the Invisible Hand. Characters can be purchased on these ships- Separatists on the Invisible Hand; characters from the Republic on the Resolute.

Plot 

The game adapts the animated film Star Wars: The Clone Wars and various episodes from the first two seasons of the television series of the same name, without dialogue and with many humorous deviations. The prologue level is based on the Geonosian Arena battle from Attack of the Clones.

Development and marketing
The game had been in development since late 2009 when the second season of Star Wars: The Clone Wars started. The game was covered up and in June 2010 after the second-season finale The Lego Group started to work on adding the last part of the second season in and new things such as a new hub and a new way to use the lightsaber. Then in late 2010, LEGO finished the game and started to make promotions for it. On 23 June 2010, LEGO released the first trailer for the game and later in 2011 they released some demos and cutscenes. Nintendo released trailers for Nintendo 3DS for the game alongside E3 convention videos featuring gameplay footage. The game was released in 2011 in North America on 22 March, in Europe on 25 March, and in Australia on 30 March following delay of one month. The 3DS version of the game was released on 31 March in Australia as a launch title for the system. A version for OS X was released on 27 October of the same year.

Reception

The game has received mixed to positive reviews. GameSpot gave 6.5/10 for PC, PlayStation 3, Xbox 360 and Wii while 6/10 for Nintendo 3DS. IGN Anthony Gallegos rated the PC, PlayStation 3, and Xbox 360 versions of the game 7.5/10, the Wii version 7/10, and the DS, 3DS, and PSP versions 6/10. He commented on the vast variety of content in the in-game hub; "the hub world is open to players to explore, but this time around, Traveller's Tales have really outdone themselves". They further stated "like so much of the Lego games design, when you combine these two relatively unexciting portions together, something strange happens: It becomes a simple, engaging game". GameTrailers gave the game 6.5/10, and called it "one of the dullest in the entire series", strongly criticising the game's repetition.

As of May 2012, the game has sold over 4 million copies worldwide.

References

External links
 

2011 video games
Action-adventure games
Cooperative video games
Split-screen multiplayer games
Games for Windows certified games
Star Wars III: The Clone Wars
Lego Star Wars
MacOS games
Nintendo 3DS games
Nintendo DS games
Platform games
PlayStation 3 games
PlayStation Portable games
Star Wars: Episode II – Attack of the Clones video games
Star Wars video games
Video game sequels
Video game prequels
Video games scored by Chance Thomas
Video games set on fictional planets
Webby Award winners
Wii games
Windows games
Xbox 360 games
LucasArts games
Traveller's Tales games
Multiplayer and single-player video games
Feral Interactive games
3D platform games
Video games developed in the United Kingdom